Dupont is an unincorporated community and U.S. Post Office in Adams County, Colorado, United States.  The Dupont Post Office has the ZIP Code 80024.

A post office called Dupont has been in operation since 1926. The community takes its name from the DuPont Company, which owned property near the original town site.

Geography
Dupont is located at  (39.838068,-104.912567).

See also
 Denver-Aurora Metropolitan Statistical Area
 Denver-Aurora-Boulder Combined Statistical Area
 Front Range Urban Corridor
 List of cities and towns in Colorado

References

Unincorporated communities in Adams County, Colorado
Unincorporated communities in Colorado
Denver metropolitan area